Mineski is an inactive esports team established on February 14, 2004 in the Philippines. They had a Dota 2 team and a professional League of Legends team.

History
Mineski was established as a DOTA esports team on February 14, 2004, by Filipino gamer Ronald Robins and his teammates in Manila, Philippines. The team competed in various domestic and international competitions including the World Cyber Games.

In December 2009, shortly after Robins retired, Robins and his former teammates went on to establish Mineski as a company (which would become known as Mineski Global) which runs an internet cafe chain primarily catering to gamers. It also started from organizing localized esports competitions hosted in its internet cafes to holding international esports tournaments.

In 2011, Mineski was invited by Valve to compete with fifteen other teams in the first ever The International.

Mineski expanded out of the Philippines in 2012, when it acquired a South Korean Dota roster. The team is no longer active.

Mineski qualified for the 2015 Frankfurt Major by winning the Southeast Asia qualifier tournament.

Mineski won the Philippine Qualifier for ESL One Manila in 2016. Mineski also won the SEA Qualifier for the Manila Majors.

In 2017, Mineski came close to winning the first tournament of the DPC 2017-2018 Season by achieving second place in the third season of the StarLadder i-League Invitational, they went on to win the next tournament, PGL Open Bucharest.

In 2018, Mineski won their first major tournament, Dota 2 Asia Championships 2018, with this achievement they also became the first team from the Southeast Asia region to win a major tournament. With this win, they secured enough DPC points to secure their slot for The International 2018, though they finished in 9-12th place as well as The International 2019. With no major achievements in DPC 2018-2019 Season, the team disbanded.

Roster 

As of May 19, 2020, Mineski have no active Dota 2 roster.

Achievements 
Sources: Mineski's Facebook page, GosuGamers, and Yahoo Esports

2013 achievements

2012 achievements

2011 achievements

2010 achievements

2009 achievements

2008 achievements

2005–2007 achievements

References

External links 
 

2004 establishments in the Philippines
Esports teams based in the Philippines
Dota teams